Opas Ruengpanyawut (18 August 1955 — 22 January 2020) was a Thai sport shooter who competed in the 1984 Summer Olympics. He also participated in eight editions of Asian Games and won seven medals.

References

External links
 

1955 births
2020 deaths
Opas Ruengpanyawut
ISSF pistol shooters
Opas Ruengpanyawut
Shooters at the 1984 Summer Olympics
Shooters at the 1982 Asian Games
Shooters at the 1986 Asian Games
Shooters at the 1990 Asian Games
Shooters at the 1994 Asian Games
Shooters at the 1998 Asian Games
Shooters at the 2002 Asian Games
Shooters at the 2006 Asian Games
Shooters at the 2010 Asian Games
Asian Games medalists in shooting
Opas Ruengpanyawut
Opas Ruengpanyawut
Medalists at the 1982 Asian Games
Medalists at the 1986 Asian Games
Medalists at the 1990 Asian Games
Medalists at the 2002 Asian Games
Medalists at the 2006 Asian Games
Opas Ruengpanyawut
Opas Ruengpanyawut
Opas Ruengpanyawut
Southeast Asian Games medalists in shooting
Competitors at the 2005 Southeast Asian Games
Opas Ruengpanyawut